Mossy Carroll (born 13 June 1957 in Garryspillane, County Limerick) is an Irish former hurler who played with his local club Garryspillane and was a member of the Limerick senior inter-county team in the 1970s and 1980s, he also played with Tipperary.  Carroll later served as manager of the Limerick and Kerry senior inter-county teams.

References

1957 births
Living people
Garryspillane hurlers
Limerick inter-county hurlers
Munster inter-provincial hurlers
Tipperary inter-county hurlers
Hurling managers